The Cribrilinidae family is a part of the suborder Ascophora within the bryozoans. They are characterized by numerous spinose ribs (costae) overarching the frontal membrane of each zooid.

Classification
The diverse nature of the large number of genera included in this family (115) may require it to be split into several families.

Family Cribrilinidae

Genus Abdomenopora
Genus Acanthobaktron
Genus Aeolopora
Genus Anaptopora
Genus Anaskopora
Genus Andriopora
Genus Angelopora
Genus Anornithopora
Genus Anotopora
Genus Argopora
Genus Ascancestor
Genus Auchenopora
Genus Baptopora
Genus Batrachopora
Genus Callistopora
Genus Calpidopora
Genus Canupora
Genus Carydiopora
Genus Castanopora
Genus Castanoporina
Genus Cillia
Genus Coelopora
Genus Collarina
Genus Confusocella
Genus Corbulipora
Genus Corymboporella
Genus Costula
Genus Craticulacella
Genus Cribralaria
Genus Cribrendoecium
Genus Cribrilaria
Genus Cribrilina
Genus Ctenopora
Genus Decurtaria
Genus Dendroperistoma
Genus Diacanthopora
Genus Diancopora
Genus Diceratopora
Genus Dishelopora
Genus Distansescharella
Genus Disteginopora
Genus Eucheilopora
Genus Figularia
Genus Filaguria
Genus Francopora
Genus Geisopora
Genus Gephyrotes
Genus Gordoniella
Genus Glabrilaria
Genus Graptoporella
Genus Haplocephalopora
Genus Hayamiellina
Genus Hesperopora
Genus Hexacanthopora
Genus Hippiopora
Genus Holostegopora
Genus Hybopora
Genus Hystricopora
Genus Ichnopora
Genus Inversiscaphos
Genus Jolietina
Genus Jullienula
Genus Kankopora
Genus Kelestoma
Genus Keratostoma
Genus Klugerella
Genus Lagynopora
Genus Lepralina
Genus Leptocheilopora
Genus Membraniporella
Genus Metracolposa
Genus Monoceratopora
Genus Morphasmopora
Genus Multescharipora
Genus Mumiella
Genus Murinopsia
Genus Myagropora
Genus Nannopora
Genus Oligotopora
Genus Opisthornithopora
Genus Otopora
Genus Pachydera
Genus Pancheilopora
Genus Parafigularia
Genus Pelmatopora
Genus Phractoporella
Genus Phrynopora
Genus Pleuroschizella
Genus Pliophloea
Genus Pnictopora
Genus Polycephalopora
Genus Polyceratopora
Genus Prodromopora
Genus Prosotopora
Genus Puellina
Genus Reginella
Genus Reginelloides
Genus Reptescharella
Genus Reptescharipora
Genus Reptoporella
Genus Rhabdopora
Genus Rhacheopora
Genus Rhiniopora
Genus Sandalopora
Genus Schistacanthopora
Genus Semiescharipora
Genus Steginopora
Genus Stichocados
Genus Taractopora
Genus Thoracopora
Genus Tricephalopora
Genus Turnerellina
Genus Ubaghsia
Genus Vavropora
Genus Vicariopora

References 

Cheilostomatida
Bryozoan families
Extant Late Cretaceous first appearances